Françoise Cactus (Villeneuve-l'Archevêque, Yonne, France, 5 may 1958 – Berlin, Germany, 17 February 2021), born Françoise Vanhove, was a French musician and author, active in Germany, best known as co-founder, vocalist, and multi-instrumentalist in the band Stereo Total. Cactus wrote several novels as well as contributing to German papers such as Die Tageszeitung. Prior to founding Stereo Total with Brezel Göring in 1993, Cactus played in the West Berlin band die Lolitas, one of only a few Western bands to play officially unsanctioned gigs in East Berlin during the final years of the dictatorship. She was originally from France, having moved to West Berlin in 1985.

Françoise Cactus peacefully died aged 62 on 17 February 2021 in her Berlin home after having suffered from breast cancer.

Radio plays
 Weill jagt Fantômas (Oliver Augst/Cactus/Göring), Radio Berlin-Brandenburg, Radio France Culture 2018 
 Alle Toten 1914 (Oliver Augst/John Birke), Deutschlandfunk Kultur, Rundfunk Berlin-Brandenburg, Volksbühne Berlin, Hessischer Rundfunk 2014 - participation as speaker, singer, musician
 City of the thousand fires (Augst/Birke), Hessischer Rundfunk/Südwestrundfunk 2012 - participation as speaker, singer

References

1964 births
2021 deaths
Deaths from cancer in Germany
Deaths from breast cancer
French emigrants to Germany
German women novelists
20th-century German women musicians
20th-century German musicians
21st-century German women musicians
21st-century German musicians
20th-century German novelists
20th-century German women writers
21st-century German novelists
21st-century German women writers
French women novelists
20th-century French women musicians
20th-century French musicians
21st-century French women musicians
21st-century French musicians
20th-century French novelists
20th-century French women writers
21st-century French novelists
21st-century French women writers
People from Yonne
Musicians from Berlin